Fiesta Key is an island in the Florida Keys, connected via causeway to U.S. 1 (or the Overseas Highway) at mile marker 70, between Long Key and Craig Key.
It was first recorded as Jew-fish Kay (later Jewfish Key, Jewfish Bush Key).
Louie Turner homesteaded the island on January 7, 1908, becoming the first recorded owner.
For a period in the 1950s and 1960s, the island was a property of The Greyhound Corporation.  During that period it was named Tropical Key, then Greyhound Key.
Kampgrounds of America (KOA) bought the island from Greyhound in 1966 and renamed it as Fiesta Key.

References

Islands of the Florida Keys
Islands of Monroe County, Florida
Islands of Florida